JPEG XS (ISO/IEC 21122) is an interoperable, visually lossless, low-latency and lightweight image and video coding system used in professional applications. Applications of the standard include streaming high quality content for virtual reality, drones, autonomous vehicles using cameras, gaming, and broadcasting (SMPTE ST 2022 and ST 2110). In this respect, JPEG XS is unique, being the first ISO codec ever designed for this specific purpose. JPEG XS, built on core technology from both intoPIX and Fraunhofer IIS, is formally standardized as ISO/IEC 21122 by the Joint Photographic Experts Group with the first edition published in 2019. Although not official, the XS acronym was chosen to highlight the eXtra Small and eXtra Speed characteristics of the codec. Today, the JPEG committee is still actively working on further improvements to XS, with the second edition scheduled for publication (beginning of 2022) and initial efforts being launched towards a third edition.

Features of JPEG XS

Three main features are key to JPEG XS:

 Visually transparent compression: XS compressed content is indistinguishable from the original uncompressed content (passing ISO/IEC 29170-2 tests) for compression ratios up to 3 bit per pixel (bpp). 
 Low latency: The total end-to-end latency, introduced by the XS compression-decompression cycle, is minimal. Depending on the configuration, XS typically imposes only between 1 and 32 lines of additional end-to-end latency, when compared to the same system using uncompressed video.
 Lightweight: XS is designed to have low computational and memory complexity, allowing for efficient low-power and low-resource implementations on various platforms such as CPU, GPU, FPGA and ASIC.

Relying on these key features, JPEG XS is suitable to be used in any application where uncompressed content is now the norm, yet still allowing for significant savings in the required bandwidth usage, preserving quality and low latency. Among the targeted use cases are video transport over professional video links (like SDI and Ethernet/IP), real-time video storage, memory buffers, omnidirectional video capture and rendering, and image sensor compression (for example in cameras and in the automotive industry). Typical compression ratios go up to 10:1 but can also be higher depending on the nature of the image or the requirements of the targeted application. JPEG XS favors visually lossless quality in combination with low latency and low complexity, over crude compression performance. Hence, it is not a direct competitor to alternative image codecs like JPEG 2000 and JPEG XL or video codecs like AV1, AVC/H.264 and HEVC/H.265.

Other important features are:

 Exact bitrate allocation: JPEG XS allows to accurately set the targeted bitrate to perfectly match the available bandwidth (also referred to as constant bitrate or CBR).
 Multi-generation robustness: JPEG XS allows for at least 10 encoding-decoding cycles, without significant quality degradation. This feature allows for example transparently chaining of multiple devices that recompress the signal, without any significant quality degradation taking place. 
 Multi-platform interoperability: The algorithms used in JPEG XS were all carefully selected to allow for efficient implementations on different platforms, like CPU, GPU, FPGA and ASIC. Each of these platform architectures is best exploited when a specific degree of parallelism is available in the implementation. For instance, a multi-core CPU implementation will benefit from a coarse-grained parallelism, while GPU or FPGA will work better with a fine-grained parallelism. Moreover, the choice of parallelism used in the implementation at the encoder will not affect that of the decoder. This means that real-time encoding and decoding between platforms is possible, without sacrificing the low complexity, low latency or high quality properties.
 Support for mathematical lossless coding (MLS): JPEG XS is also capable of coding images in a mathematically lossless way, in order to achieve perfect reconstruction at the decoder side (new profile supported by 2nd edition).
 Support for High Dynamic Range (HDR) content: The current version of JPEG XS supports bit-depths of up to 16 bits per component, and it provides a number of parameterizable non-linear transforms (NLTs) to efficiently compress HDR content.
 Support for RAW Bayer/CFA compression: JPEG XS also offers compression of Color Filter Array (CFA) content, such as RAW Bayer content produced by digital cameras. A special color transform, called Star-Tetrix, allows for efficient and direct compression of the original RAW sample values, without the need for converting the Bayer samples to RGB samples first.
Accurate flow control: A JPEG XS encoder continuously monitors the amount of bits send out, and adjusts its rate allocation process to neither overflow nor underflow a normatively defined decoder input buffer. This is a unique feature of JPEG XS it does not have in common with any other JPEG codec.

Application domains

This section lists them main application domains where JPEG XS is actively used. New and other application domains are subject to be added in the future, like for example framebuffer compression or AR/VR applications.

Transport over video links and IP networks 

Video bandwidth requirements are growing continuously, as video resolutions, frame rates, bit depths and the amount of video streams are constantly increasing. Likewise, the capacities of video links and communication channels are also growing, yet at a slower pace than what is needed to address the huge video bandwidth growth. In addition, the investments to upgrade the capacity of links and channels are significant and need to be amortized over several years.

Moreover, both the broadcast and pro-AV markets are shifting towards AV-over-IP based infrastructure, with a preference going to 1 Gigabit Ethernet links for remote production or 10G  Ethernet networks for in-house facilities. Both 1G, 2.5G and 10G Ethernet are cheap and ubiquitous, while 25G or better links are usually not yet affordable. Given the available bandwidth and infrastructure cost, relying on uncompressed video is therefore no longer an option, as 4K, 8K, increased bit depths (for HDR), and higher framerates need to be supported.

JPEG XS offers a light-weight compression that visually preserves the quality compared to an uncompressed stream, at a low cost, targeted at compression ratios of up to 10:1. With XS, it is for example possible to repurpose existing SDI cables to transport 4K60 over a single 3G-SDI (at 4:1), and even over a single HD-SDI (at 8:1). Similar scenarios can be used to transport 8K60 content over various SDI cable types (e.g. 6G-SDI and 12G-SDI). Alternatively, XS enables transporting 4K60 content over 1G Ethernet and 8K60 over 5G or 10G Ethernet, which would be impossible without compression. The following table shows some expected compression ranges for some typical use cases.

Real-time video storage and playout

Related to the transport of video streams is the storage and retrieval of high resolution streams where bandwidth limitations similarly apply. For instance, video cameras use internal storage like SSD drives or SD cards to hold large streams of images, yet the maximum data rates of such storage devices are limited and well below the uncompressed video throughput.

Sensor compression

As stated, JPEG XS offers built-in support for the direct compression of RAW Bayer/CFA images using the Star-Tetrix Color Transform. This transform takes a RAW Bayer pattern image and decorrelates the samples into a 4-component image with each component having only a quarter of the resolution. This means that the total amount of samples to further process and compress remains the same, yet the values are decorrerlated in a similar fashion to a classical Multiple Component Transform.

Avoiding such conversion prevents loss of information and allows that this processing step be done outside of the camera. This is advantageous because it allows to defer demosaicing the Bayer content from the moment of capturing to the production phase, where choices regarding artistic intent and various settings can be better made. Recall that the demosaicing process is irreversible and requires certain choices, like the choice of interpolation algorithm or the level of noise reduction, to be made up front. Moreover, the demosaicing process can be power-hungry and will also introduce extra latency and complexity. The ability to push this step out of the camera is possible with JPEG XS and allows to use more advanced algorithms resulting in better quality in the end.

Standards

JPEG XS (ISO/IEC 21122)

The JPEG XS coding system is an ISO/IEC suite of standards that consists of the following parts:

Part 1, formally designated as ISO/IEC 21122-1, describes the core coding system of JPEG XS. This standard defines the syntax and, similarly to other JPEG and MPEG image codecs, the decompression process to reconstruct a continuous-tone digital image from its encoded codestream. Part 1 does provide some guidelines of the inverse process that compresses a digital image into a compressed codestream, or more simply called the encoding process, but leaves implementation specific optimizations and choices to the implementers.

Part 2 (ISO/IEC 21122-2) builds on top of Part 1 to segregate different applications and uses of JPEG XS into reduced coding tool subsets with tighter constraints. The definition of profiles, levels and sublevels allows reducing the complexity of implementations in particular application use cases, while also safeguarding interoperability. Recall that lower complexity typically means less power consumption, lower production costs, easier constraints, etc. Profiles represent interoperability subsets of the codestream syntax specified in Part 1. In addition, levels and sublevels provide limits to the maximum throughput in respectively the encoded (codestream) and the decoded (spatial and pixels) image domains. Part 2 furthermore also specifies a buffer model, consisting of a decoder model and a transmission channel model, in order to enable guaranteeing low latency requirements to a fraction of the frame size.

Part 3 (ISO/IEC 21122-3) specifies transport and container formats for JPEG XS codestreams. It defines carriage of important metadata, like color spaces, mastering display metadata (MDM), and EXIF, in order to facilitate transport, editing and presentation. Furthermore, this part defines the XS-specific ISOBMFF boxes, an Internet Media Type registration and additional syntax to allow embedding XS in formats like MP4, MPEG-2 TS, or the HEIF image file format.

Part 4 (ISO/IEC 21122-4) is a supporting standard of JPEG XS that provides conformance testing and buffer model verification. This standard is crucial to implementers of XS and appliance conformance testing.

And finally, Part 5 (ISO/IEC 21122-5) represents a reference software implementation (written in ISO C11) of the JPEG XS Part 1 decoder, conforming to the Part 2 profiles, levels and sublevels, as well as an exemplary encoder implementation.

A second edition of all five parts is in the making and will be published at latest in the beginning of 2022. It provides additional coding tools, profiles and levels, and new reference software to add support for efficient compression of 4:2:0 content, RAW Bayer/CFA content, and mathematically lossless compression.

RFC9134 - RTP Payload Format for ISO/IEC 21122 (JPEG XS)

RFC 9134 describes a payload format for the Real-Time Transport Protocol (RTP, RFC 3550) to carry JPEG XS encoded video.

The RTP Payload Format for JPEG XS in turn enables using JPEG XS in SMPTE ST 2110 environments using SMPTE ST 2110-22 for CBR compressed video transport.

MPEG-TS for JPEG XS

See MPEG-2, Part 1, 8th edition (to be published). Note that AMD1 (Carriage of LCEVC
and other improvements) of ISO/IEC 13818-1 8th edition contains some additional corrections, improvements and clarifications regarding JPEG XS embedding in MPEG-2.

VSF TR-07 and TR-08

See TR-07: Transport of JPEG XS Video in MPEG-2 TS over IP and TR-08: Transport of JPEG XS Video in ST 2110-22, published by the Video Services Forum, Inc.

NMOS with JPEG XS
A Networked Media Open Specifications that enables registration, discovery, and connection management of JPEG XS endpoints using the AMWA IS-04 and IS-05 NMOS Specifications. See AMWA BCP-006-01: NMOS With JPEG XS, published by Advanced Media Workflow Association.

History

The JPEG committee started the standardization activity in 2016 with an open call for a high-performance, low complexity image coding standard. The best performing candidates, namely codecs from the Belgian company intoPIX and Fraunhofer IIS, formed the basis for the new standard. First implementations were demonstrated in April 2018 at the NAB Show and later that year at the International Broadcasting Convention. XS was also presented at CES in 2019.

Technical overview

Core coding

The JPEG XS standard is a classical wavelet-based still-image codec without any frame buffer. While the standard defines JPEG XS on the basis of a hypothetical reference coder, JPEG XS is easier to explain through the steps a typical encoder performs:

Component up-scaling and optional component decorrelation: In the first step, the DC gain of the input data is removed and it is upscaled to a bit-precision of 20 bits. Optionally, a multi-component generation, identical to the JPEG 2000 RCT, is applied. This transformation is a lossless approximation of an RGB to YUV conversion, generating one luma and two chroma channels.

Wavelet transformation: Input data is spacially decorrelated by a 5/3 Daubechies wavelet filter. While a five-stage transformation is performed in horizontal direction, only 0 to 2 transformations are run in vertical direction. The reason for this asymmetrical filter is to minimize latency.

Prequantization: The output of the wavelet filter is converted to a sign-magnitude representation and pre-quantized by a deadzone Quantizer to 16 bit precision.

Rate control and quantization: The encoder determines by a non-normative process the rate of each possible quantization setting and then quantizes data by either a deadzone Quantizer or a data dependent uniform Quantizer.

Entropy coding: JPEG XS uses minimalistic Entropy encoding for the quantized data which proceeds in up to four passes over horizontal lines of quantized wavelet coefficients. The steps are:

 Significance coding: In the (optional) first pass, the significance of 32 consecutive wavelet coefficients is coded by a single bit. 
 Bitplane count coding: In the second pass, the number of non-zero bitplanes of groups of four coefficients each, the so-called "bitplane count", is entropy coded through a Golomb type code. This step may optionally use the bitplane counts of the preceding line as source for prediction (Differential pulse-code modulation) and then encodes only the prediction difference. 
 Data coding:The third pass inserts the raw bitplane values into the codestream without further coding.
 Sign coding: In the last optional coding pass, the sign bits of all non-zero coefficients is inserted into the codestream. If this coding pass is not present, sign bits are included in the data coding pass for all coefficients.

Codestream packing All entropy coded data are packed into a linear stream of bits (grouped in byte multiples) along with the all of the required image metadata. This sequence of bytes is called the codestream and its high-level syntax is based on the typical JPEG markers and marker segments syntax.

Profiles, levels and sublevels

JPEG XS defines profiles (in ISO/IEC 21122-2) that define subsets of coding tools which conforming decoders shall support, by limiting the permitted parameter values and allowed markers. The following table represents an overview of all the profiles along with their most important properties. Please refer to the standard for a complete specification of each profile.

In addition, JPEG XS defines levels to represent a lower bound on the required throughput that conforming decoders need to support in the decoded image domain (also called the spatial domain). The following table lists the levels as defined by JPEG XS. The maximums are given in the context of the sampling grid, so they refer to a per pixel value where each pixel represents one or more component values. However, in the context of Bayer data JPEG XS internally interprets the Bayer pattern as an interleaved grid of four components. This means that the number of sampling grid points required to represent a Bayer image is four times smaller than the total number of Bayer sample points. Each group of 2x2 (four) Bayer values gets interpreted as one sampling grid point with four components. Thus sensor resolutions should be divided by four to calculate the respective width, height and amount of sampling grid points. For this reason, all levels also bear double names. Please refer to the standard for a complete specification of each level.

Similarly to the concept of levels, JPEG XS defines sublevels to represent a lower bound on the required throughput that conforming decoders need to support in the encoded image domain. Each sublevel is defined by a nominal bits per pixel (Nbpp) value that indicates the maximum amount of bits per pixel for an encoded image of maximum permissible number of sampling grid points according to the selected conformance level. Thus, decoders conforming to a particular level and sublevel shall conform to the following constraints derived from Nbpp:

The following table lists the existing sublevels and their respective nominal bpp values. Please refer to the standard for a complete specification of each level.

Patents and RAND

JPEG XS contains patented technology which is made available for licensing via the JPEG XS Patent Portfolio License (JPEG XS PPL). This license pool covers essential patents owned by Licensors for implementing the ISO/IEC 21122 JPEG XS video coding standard and is available under RAND terms.

References

XS
IEC standards
ISO standards
Lossy compression algorithms
Image compression
Raster graphics file formats